James Hutchinson Davidson (1902-1982), was an Australian bandleader and jazz musician who worked for the BBC in England from 1947 to 1963.

Career 
James Davidson grew up in Birchgrove, New South Wales and began playing brass instruments in 1917 with the Compulsory Military Training Band. He played drums and cornet and began to perform as part of cinema pit ensembles and dance bands.

During the 1930s Davidson led the Jim Davidson Dance Band which performed nationally on ABC Radio. Columbia Records released hundreds of records of his performances, and between 1937 and 1939 his ABC band made three interstate tours.

Davidson joined the Australian Imperial Force in 1943 and formed the Army Entertainment Group which led variety shows troops in the Middle East and the South-West Pacific areas during World War II.

After the war, Davidson applied unsuccessfully for the position of director of light entertainment at the ABC. In 1948 he was appointed Assistant Head of Variety and Musical Productions at the BBC, and moved to England. He was responsible for supporting programs such as The Goon Show. He retired in September 1963 and returned to Australia.

Personal life 
Davidson married Marjorie McFarlane, an artist, on 7 June 1935. They lived in Melbourne until 1948, when they moved to England. They returned to Australia in 1964 and worked together as house renovators and gardeners in New South Wales.

Davidson died on 10 April 1982. Prior to his death, he had been working on a memoir which was published posthumously as A Showman’s Story in 1983.

References 

Australian jazz musicians
1902 births
1982 deaths